Tony Hearn (born 18 August 1969) is an Australian former professional rugby league footballer who played in the 1990s.  Hearn played for the North Sydney Bears  South Queensland Crushers and St. George Dragons.  He also represented Queensland in 7 state of origin games between  1995–97. While not born in Queensland, Hearn grew up there.

Playing career
Hearn made his first grade debut for North Sydney in Round 3 1992 against St George.  

In 1994, Hearn made 16 appearances for Norths as the club finished 2nd on the table, enjoying their best season in several years.  Norths reached the preliminary final but were defeated by eventual premiers Canberra with Hearn playing in the match.

In 1995, Norths qualified for the finals with Hearn making 10 appearances.  His final game for Norths was a 14–14 draw against the Gold Coast.

In 1996, Hearn joined South Queensland and made 15 appearances for the club as they finished last on the table.  

In 1997, Hearn joined St George playing with them for 2 seasons before retiring at the end of 1998.

References

External links
Tony Hearn FOG'S
Tony Hearn Rugby League Project

Australian rugby league players
North Sydney Bears players
South Queensland Crushers players
St. George Dragons players
Queensland Rugby League State of Origin players
Living people
1969 births
Rugby league props